Ara is a village and union council of Choa Saidan Shah Tehsil in Chakwal District, Punjab Pakistan. 

Between Nandana Fort and Basharat Village Chakwal-Union-Councils.

Villages in Arra include Dhok Chitti, Dhok Chatha, Dhok Dhamial, Dhock Lohara, Dhock Gujjar , Dhok Khathan e.t.c

References

Union councils of Chakwal District
Populated places in Chakwal District